Arctanthemum is a genus of flowering plants in the daisy family.

 Species
 Arctanthemum arcticum (L.) Tzvelev - Russian Far East 
 Arctanthemum integrifolium (Richardson) Tzvelev - coastal areas of Russia, Alaska, and Canada (incl Hudson Bay)
 Arctanthemum yezoense (Maekawa) Tzvelev- Japan + Kuril Islands (called Yezo in Japanese, hence the epithet)

References

External links

Asteraceae genera
Anthemideae